A hexadentate ligand in coordination chemistry is a ligand that combines with a central metal atom with six bonds. One example of a hexadentate ligand that can form complexes with soft metal ions is TPEN.  A commercially important hexadentate ligand is EDTA.

The denticity of hexadentate ligands is often denoted with the prefix κ6.

Topology
The way the donor atoms are joined together in the molecule is its topology. Some topologies are simple, such as the linear or ring shapes. The molecule can also be branched, either at a donor atom, or at a non-donor atom. Example shapes are the tripod, and amplector, with a bifurcation at each end. Rigid molecules can be used to force unusual coordination such as trigonal prism. F. Lions identified 36 different hexadentate topologies.

References

Ligands